The Conseil scolaire catholique Providence (Csc Providence) is the French-language Catholic school board for southwestern Ontario, Canada. The Providence Catholic School Board includes 10,000 students in its 31 schools: 23 elementary schools and 8 high schools for the communities of Windsor-Essex, Chatham-Kent, Sarnia-Lambton, London/Middlesex, Oxford-Woodstock, Grey-Bruce and Huron-Perth. The Providence CSB ranks first among all school boards located in Southwestern Ontario with a graduation rate of 93% as of 2020. The board was previously known as the Conseil scolaire de district des écoles catholiques du Sud-Ouest (CSDÉCSO).

The board's head office is in Windsor, and it maintains satellite offices in the Pain Court section of Chatham-Kent, and in London; the London office serves Middlesex County.

Elementary schools
École élémentaire catholique Frère-André, London
École élémentaire catholique Georges-P.-Vanier, Windsor
École élémentaire catholique Monseigneur-Augustin-Caron, LaSalle
École élémentaire catholique Monseigneur-Jean-Noël, Windsor
École élémentaire catholique Pavillon des Jeunes, Belle-Rivière
École élémentaire catholique Saint-Ambroise, St. Joachim
École élémentaire catholique Saint-Antoine, Tecumseh
École élémentaire catholique Saint-Dominique-Savio, Owen Sound
École élémentaire catholique Saint-Edmond, Windsor
École élémentaire catholique Saint-Francis, Tilbury
École élémentaire catholique Saint-Jean-Baptiste, Amherstburg
École élémentaire catholique Saint-Jean-de-Brébeuf, London
École élémentaire catholique Saint-Michel, Leamington
École élémentaire catholique Saint-Paul, Pointe-aux-Roches
École élémentaire catholique Saint-Philippe, Grande Pointe
École élémentaire catholique Saint-Thomas-d'Aquin, Sarnia
École élémentaire catholique Sainte-Catherine, Pain Court
École élémentaire catholique Sainte-Jeanne-d'Arc, London
École élémentaire catholique Sainte-Marguerite-Bourgeoys, Woodstock
École élémentaire catholique Sainte-Marguerite-d'Youville, Tecumseh
École élémentaire catholique Sainte-Marie, Chatham
École élémentaire catholique Sainte-Thérèse, Windsor
École élémentaire catholique Sainte-Ursule, McGregor

Secondary schools
École secondaire catholique de Pain Court, Pain Court
École secondaire catholique E. J. Lajeunesse, Windsor
École secondaire catholique l'Essor, Tecumseh
École secondaire catholique Monseigneur-Bruyère, London
École secondaire catholique Notre-Dame, Woodstock
École secondaire catholique Saint-Dominique-Savio, Owen Sound
École secondaire catholique Saint-François-Xavier, Sarnia
École secondaire catholique Sainte-Trinité, Windsor

See also

List of school districts in Ontario
List of high schools in Ontario

References

External links
 Conseil scolaire catholique Providence 
 Conseil scolaire de district des écoles catholiques du Sud-Ouest (Archive) 

Book burnings
Conseil
French-language school districts in Ontario
Roman Catholic school districts in Ontario